Biecz County was an administrative unit (powiat) of both the Kingdom of Poland and the Polish–Lithuanian Commonwealth. With its seat in the town of Biecz, it was part of Kraków Voivodeship. Biecz County existed from the second half of the 14th century, until the first partition of Poland in 1772.

In the early Kingdom of Poland, the ancient town of Biecz was the seat of a castellany. In the 14th century, when castellanies were replaced by counties, the expansive Biecz County was created, one of seven such units of Kraków Voivodeship. Apart from Biecz itself, it included such towns, as Jasło, Gorlice, Dukla and Ciezkowice.

In 1772, following first partition of Poland, Biecz was annexed by the Habsburg Empire. The county was disbanded by Austrian authorities in 1783.

Sources 
 Biecz, a community of Gorlice County

Former counties of Poland
History of Lesser Poland